Jan Michaelis (born 15 January 1978) is a German snowboarder. He competed at the 2002 Winter Olympics and the 2006 Winter Olympics. He won the FIS Snowboard World Cup in the discipline halfpipe in the 2001/2002 and 2005/2006 season.

References

1978 births
Living people
German male snowboarders
Olympic snowboarders of Germany
Snowboarders at the 2002 Winter Olympics
Snowboarders at the 2006 Winter Olympics
Sportspeople from Hamburg
21st-century German people